Watchtower is a fantasy novel by American writer Elizabeth A. Lynn published in 1979.

Plot summary
Watchtower is a novel that is first in a trilogy about Tomor Keep.

Reception
Greg Costikyan reviewed Watchtower in Ares Magazine #3 and commented that "The plot is a common one; the birthright of a young lord is stolen by invaders, and he must escape and gather forces to reconquer his rightful domain. The book is saved by fine and unpretentious writing, full-fledged characters, and fast-paced plotting.  Lynn, I suspect, is another new writer to watch."

Watchtower won the World Fantasy Award—Novel for 1980.

Reviews
Review by Fritz Leiber (1979) in Locus, #222 June 1979
Review by Brian Stableford (1980) in Foundation, #18 January 1980
Review by Charles N. Brown (1979) in Isaac Asimov's Science Fiction Magazine, August 1979

References

1979 American novels
1979 fantasy novels
American fantasy novels
Berkley Books books